Tampin is a town in Tampin District, Negeri Sembilan, Malaysia, which borders Pulau Sebang town in Alor Gajah District, Malacca. It is also situated at the southern tip of the longest mountain range in Malaysia, the Titiwangsa Mountains, from a geographical standpoint.

Tampin is located around 60 km south of the state capital city of Seremban and 30 km northwest of Malacca City, Malacca.

Etymology
Tampin gets its name from the container or pouch weaved from the pandanus fronds. The container was used to store condiments such as the sticky dessert kelamai or dodol and the shrimp paste belacan. The district of Tampin is also called Luak Tampin as the word luak is the local term for a district.

History
Tampin was originally part of Luak of Rembau. After the Naning War in 1832, Raja Ali declared himself the ruler of Seri Menanti and his son-in-law, Syed Shaaban, as the ruler of Rembau. This enraged other rulers of Negeri Sembilan as they had no right to the posts. In 1834 a civil war ensued, which resulted in Raja Ali and Syed Shaaban retreating to Tampin and the area from Mount Tampin to Bukit Putus being removed from Rembau. The provinces of Repah, Keru, Tebong and Tampin Tengah formed the district known as Tampin. Syed Shaaban became the first ruler of Tampin and proclaimed himself the title Tunku Besar Tampin. The district is one of the original confederation of nine states collectively known as Negeri Sembilan, which literally mean
"Nine States" in Malay.

On 11 March 1889, the Governor of the Straits Settlements, Sir Cecil Smith, held a meeting with the rulers of Jelebu, Sungai Ujong, Rembau, Seri Menanti and Tampin. The purpose of this meeting was to combine the districts to better manage them under British rule. Tampin, Rembau and Seri Menanti agreed to the proposal and were united as the Seri Menanti Confederation. The newly formed confederation accepted Martin Lister as its first British Resident.

After the independence of Malaya in 1957, Negeri Sembilan and its districts started forming local administrative councils. Formerly known as the Tampin Town Board, the Tampin District Council was established on 1st of July 1980, as a result of a restructure of the state via the Local Government Act of 1976.

Politics
Tampin is a parliamentary constituency in the Dewan Rakyat of the Malaysian Parliament. The current Member of Parliament is Hasan Bahrom of federal ruling coalition, Pakatan Harapan.

In turn, Tampin provides 3 seats to the Negeri Sembilan State Legislative Assembly:
 Repah, containing downtown Tampin, currently held by DAP;
 Gemencheh, held by BN; and
 Gemas, also held by BN.

Transport
Tampin is well served by the Malaysian transport system. By car it is accessible by either North–South Expressway using the Simpang Ampat exit in neighbouring Malacca, or using Federal Route 1 which connects Tampin to Seremban and Johor Bahru. This town is also linked to Alor Gajah and Malacca City via Federal Route 61. Tampin is also the southern end of Federal Route 9 which begins in Karak in the east coast state of Pahang. Motorists from Malacca are thus able to access the East Coast Expressway to get to Kuantan or Kuala Terengganu while bypassing Kuala Lumpur.

In terms of public transport, Tampin is served by the KTMB. In fact, Gemas, which is part of Tampin district, is the meeting point of West Malaysia's eastern and western railway lines. The Pulau Sebang/Tampin railway station is in Pulau Sebang, which is on the Malaccan side, about 1 kilometer from the town centre. Furthermore, since Malacca City does not have a railway station, people living in Malacca normally have to travel to the station in order to get on a train. There was a track from Pulau Sebang to Malacca City before World War II but it was dismantled by the Japanese Imperial Army during the war for the construction of the infamous Burmese Death Railway.

See also
Pulau Sebang
Batang Melaka

References

External links

Tampin District Council

Tampin District
Towns in Negeri Sembilan